The nature–culture divide is the notion of a dichotomy between humans and the environment. In the past, insight was sought solely from the perceived tensions between nature and culture, but today it is considered whether the two entities function separately from one another, or if they are in a continuous biotic relationship with each other or not.  It is a theoretical foundation of contemporary anthropology.

In East Asian society nature and culture are conceptualized as dichotomous (separate and distinct domains of reference). Some researchers consider culture to be "man's secret adaptive weapon" in the sense that it is the core means of survival. It has been observed that the terms "nature" and "culture" can not necessarily be translated into non-western languages, for example, the Native American scholar John Mohawk described "nature" as "anything that supports life".

It has been suggested that small scale-societies can have a more symbiotic relationship with nature. But less symbiotic relations with nature are limiting small-scale communities' access to water and food resources. It was also argued that the contemporary Man-Nature divide manifests itself in different aspects of alienation and conflicts. 
Greenwood and Stini argue that agriculture is only monetarily cost-efficient because it takes much more to produce than one can get out of eating their own crops, e.g. "high culture cannot come at low energy costs".

During the 1960s and 1970s Sherry Ortner showed the parallel between the divide and gender roles with women as nature and men as culture.

Understanding the history of how the nature-culture dichotomy came to be will help environmentalists and policy makers alike determine a new future in human and nature relations. Some elements to understanding this history are cultural (society) differences in views of land, theories behind the perpetuation of the dichotomy, and real-world examples of its existence even today.

History 
Within European culture, land was an inherited right for each family's firstborn son and every other child would need to find another way to own land. European expansion would be motivated by this desire to claim land, extract resources through technological developments or the invention of public trading companies. Other factors also include religious (e.g. Crusades) and discovery (e.g. voyages) purposes. In addition to the desire for expansion, Europeans had the resources for external growth. They had ships, maps, and knowledge—a complex of politics, economy, and military tactics that they believed were superior for ruling. These factors helped them to possess and rule the people of the lands they came in contact with. One large element of this was Westren European's strong cultural belief in private property.

Colonialists from Europe saw the American landscape as desolate, savage, dark, a waste and thus needed to be tamed in order for it to be safe and habitable. One cleared and settled, these areas were depicted as “Eden itself." Land was a commodity, and as such, anyone who did not use it to turn a profit, could have it taken from them. John Locke was one responsible for these ideals. Yet the commodities didn't end with the acquisition of land. Profit became the main driver for all resources that would follow (including slavery). The cultural divide that existed between Europeans and the native groups they colonized allowed the Europeans to capitalize on both the local and global trade. So whether the ruling of these other lands and peoples was direct or indirect, the diffusion of European ideals and practices spread to nearly every country on the globe. Imperialism and globalization were also at play in creating a ruling dominion for the European nation, but it did not come without challenges. Aside from the cultural difference in relationships with land, language was a common barrier. One example being that tribal groups did not have a definition for colonization or civilization.

The native groups they encountered saw their relationship with the land in a more holistic view. They saw the land as a shared entity of which they were a part, but the Europeans saw it as a commodity that could and should be divided and owned by individuals to then buy and sell as they pleased. And that “wilderness” as that when the connection between humans and nature is broken. For native communities, human intervention was a part of their ecological practices.

Theories

The Role of Society 
Preexisting movements include a spectrum of environmental thought. Authors, Büscher and Fletcher, present these various movements onto a condensed map. Though it is simplified in thought and definition, it offers an excellent way for readers to see the major conservation movements plotted together in which elements of their philosophy are highlighted. The following movements are as follows: mainstream conservation, new conservation, neoprotectionism, and their newly proposed convivial conservation. Each movement is plotted against two major factors: capitalism and the human-nature divide. Mainstream conservation supports the human-nature divide and capitalism, new conservation supports the human-nature divide but rejects capitalism, neoprotectionism rejects capitalism but supports the human-nature divide, and convivial conservation rejects both the human-nature divide and capitalism. This newest movement, though reminiscent of previous ones, sets itself apart by addressing the political climate more directly. They argue this is important because without it, their movement will only gain as much traction as those before it, i.e. very little. Lasting change will come, not only from an overhaul in human-nature relations and capitalist thought, but from a political system that will enact and support these changes.

The Role of Science 
The nature–culture divide is deeply intertwined with the social versus biological debate, since it both are implications of each other. As viewed in earlier forms of Anthropology, it is believed that genetic determinism de-emphasizes the importance of culture, making it obsolete. However, more modern views show that culture is valued more than nature because everyday aspects of culture have a wider impact on how the humans see the world, rather than just our genetic makeup. Older anthropological theories have separated the two, such as Franz Boas, who claimed that social organization and behavior is purely the transmission of social norms and not necessarily the passing of hereditable traits. Instead of using such a contrasting approach, more modern anthropologists see Neo-Darwinism as an outline for culture, therefore nature is essentially guiding how culture develops. When looking at adaptations, anthropologists such as Daniel Nettle believe that behavior associated with cultural groups is a development of genetic difference between groups. Essentially, he states that animals choose their mates based on their environment, which is shaped directly by culture. More importantly, the adaptations seen in nature are a result of evoked nature, which is defined as cultural characteristics which shape the environment and that then queue changes in phenotypes for future generations. Put simply, cultures that promote more effective resource allocation and chance for survival are more likely to be successful and produce more developed societies and cultures feed off of each other.

On the other hand, transmitted culture can be used to bridge the gap between the two even more, for it uses a trial and error based approach that shows how humans are constantly learning, and that they use social learning to influence individual choices. This is seen best about how the more superficial aspects of culture still are intertwined with nature and genetic variation. For example, there are beauty standards intertwined into the culture because they are associated with better survival rates, yet they also serve personal interests which allows for individual breeding pairs to understand how they fit into society. Additionally, cultural lags dissolve because it is not sustainable for reproduction, and cultural norms that benefit biology continue to persevere. By learning from each other, nature becomes more intertwined with culture since they reinforce each other.

Since nature and culture are now viewed as more intertwined than ever before, which makes the divide between the two seems obsolete. Similarly, the social scientists have been reluctant to use biological explanations as explanations for cultural divisions because it is difficult to construct what "biological" explanations entail. According to social scientists like Emile Durkheim, anthropologists and especially sociologists have tended to characterize biological explanations in only a physiological and cognitive sense within individuals, not in a group setting. On the other hand, there is a heavier focus on the social determinism as seen in human behavior instead. Furthermore, even as divide between nature and culture has been narrowed there is a reluctance to define biological determinism on a large scale.

Real-World Examples

National Parks 
There is a historical belief that wilderness must not only be tamed to be protected but that humans also need to be outside of it. In fact, there have been instances where the removal of people from an area have actually increased illegal activities and negative environmental effects. National parks may not be particularly known as places of increased violence, but they do perpetuate the idea of humans being removed from nature to protect it. They also create a symbol of power for humans over nature, as these sites have become tourist attractions. Ecotourism, even with eco practices in effect, still represents a commodification of nature.

Another example can be seen in “the great frontier.” The American frontier became the nation's most sacred myth of origin. Yet the lands protected as monuments to the American past were constructed as pristine and uninhabited by removing the people that lived and survived on those lands. Some authors have come to describe this type of conservation as conservation-far, where humans and nature are kept separate. The other end of the conservation spectrum then, would be conservation-near, which would mimic native ecological practices of humans integrated into the care of nature.

See also 

 Nature versus nurture

References

Cultural anthropology
Ecological theories
Culture and the environment